Berlin Ostbahnhof (German for Berlin East railway station) is a main line railway station in Berlin, Germany. It is located in the Friedrichshain quarter, now part of Friedrichshain-Kreuzberg borough, and has undergone several name changes in its history. It was known as Berlin Hauptbahnhof from 1987 to 1998, a name now applied to Berlin's new central station at the former Lehrter station. Alongside Berlin Zoologischer Garten station it was one of the city's two main stations; however, it has declined in significance since the opening of the new Hauptbahnhof on 26 May 2006, and many mainline trains have been re-routed on the North–South mainline through the new Tiergarten tunnel, bypassing Ostbahnhof.

History

Early history
The station opened on 23 October 1842 as Frankfurter Bahnhof, the terminus of an  railway line to Frankfurt (Oder) via Fürstenwalde (Spree). In 1845 the previously independent Berlin–Frankfurt railway merged into the Niederschlesisch-Märkische-Eisenbahngesellschaft (Lower Silesian-Markish Railway Company, NME), aiming at the extension of the line from Frankfurt to Breslau. After the NME lines were taken over by the Prussian state in 1852, the station was renamed Schlesischer Bahnhof (Silesian Station).

In 1867 the Old Ostbahnhof (also called Küstriner Bahnhof), the terminus of the Prussian Eastern Railway line was opened, located slightly north of the present Ostbahnhof station. In 1882 the Old Ostbahnhof was again abandoned and Schlesischer Bahnhof was rebuilt on the present site when construction began on the Berlin Stadtbahn, an elevated railway through the Berlin city center built to link the city's major stations. The Stadtbahn was completed in 1886; two of the four tracks later came to form one of the main routes of the Berlin S-Bahn suburban railway.

As the terminus of both the Silesian and the Eastern Railway line, Schlesischer Bahnhof quickly developed to Berlin's "Gate to the East". Until World War I, trains ran from the German capital via Königsberg to Saint Petersburg (Nord Express) and to Moscow as well as to Vienna, Budapest, and Constantinople via Breslau and Kattowitz. During the Anti-Jewish pogroms in the Russian Empire, numerous Jewish refugees arrived here to travel on to the emigration harbors in Hamburg and Bremerhaven.

World War II and GDR

The station was severely damaged by strategic bombing during World War II and had to be completely rebuilt by the East German railway, the Deutsche Reichsbahn. In 1950 it was renamed Berlin Ostbahnhof, as upon the implementation of the Oder–Neisse line, the former Silesia province was now largely a part of Poland, and its German population expelled. Memories of the German history of Silesia were repressed by the German Democratic Republic. Following the division of Germany, the station was, together with Berlin-Lichtenberg, one of two major railway stations in East Berlin. Express trains ran from Ostbahnhof to Leipzig, Halle, and Dresden. The station was again served by international trains like the Vindobona to Vienna.

In 1987 the postwar building was demolished and the station began to be rebuilt as East Berlin's main station, grandly renamed Berlin Hauptbahnhof (Berlin Central Station). The plan called for a hotel and a large reception area for arriving Soviet bloc dignitaries. However, only part of the work was complete by the time of German reunification in 1990. A partially built staircase to the underground car park from this period in front of the station remains (in 2006) unfinished and fenced off. A partly constructed hotel was demolished in the early 1990s.

Recent years
The name Hauptbahnhof remained long after the division of Berlin ended, until 1998, when the station was re-renamed Berlin Ostbahnhof, restoring the 1950-1987 name. One year later, work began to demolish the station and rebuild it once again, which was completed in 2002. Little remains of the 1980s structure except for an administrative block, some façade elements, and parts of the platform structure.

Characteristics
The station has 11 tracks and 9 platforms. 5 platforms are used for main line and 4 for S-Bahn. 2 tracks are through tracks.

Train services

The station is served by the following service(s):

Long distance

Regional services
Regional services  Magdeburg – Brandenburg – Potsdam – Berlin – Erkner – Fürstenwalde – Frankfurt (Oder) (– Cottbus)
Regional services  Dessau – Bad Belzig – Michendorf – Berlin –  Flughafen BER - Terminal 1-2 – Wünsdorf-Waldstadt
Local services  Nauen – Falkensee – Berlin –  Flughafen BER - Terminal 1-2
Berlin S-Bahn services  Spandau - Westkreuz – Hauptbahnhof – Alexanderplatz – Ostbahnhof – Ostkreuz – Karlshorst – Köpenick – Erkner
Berlin S-Bahn services  Westkreuz – Hauptbahnhof – Alexanderplatz – Ostbahnhof – Ostkreuz – Lichtenberg – Strausberg Nord
Berlin S-Bahn services  Potsdam – Wannsee – Westkreuz – Hauptbahnhof – Alexanderplatz – Ostbahnhof – Ostkreuz – Lichtenberg – Ahrensfelde
Berlin S-Bahn services  Spandau - Westkreuz – Hauptbahnhof - Alexanderplatz – Ostbahnhof – Schöneweide –  Flughafen BER - Terminal 1-2

In popular culture
The Ostbahnhof was featured in the 2004 movie The Bourne Supremacy. In the film, Jason Bourne (Matt Damon) is seen parking his car here, entering the station and leaving a bag in a locker, and tracking down Pamela Landy (Joan Allen).

See also
East Side Gallery
Maria am Ostbahnhof
Deutsche Bahn
Sibirjak
S-Bahn Berlin
B.V.G.
Berlin Wriezener Bahnhof

References

External links

 Berlin Ostbahnhof information on the website of Deutsche Bahn

Railway stations in Berlin
Buildings and structures in Friedrichshain-Kreuzberg
Berlin S-Bahn stations
Railway stations in Germany opened in 1842
1842 establishments in Prussia